Panuku Development Auckland is one of the five council-controlled organisations (CCOs) of Auckland Council in Auckland, New Zealand.

Panuku buys, manages and sells property on behalf of the council and its CCOs. It does not develop the sites directly, but acts as the "master developer" to "unlock development potential for others." It has portfolios that range from small housing developments to long-term regeneration such as the Wynyard Quarter on Auckland's waterfront, and to redevelopment of town centres and malls.

Panuku came into existence on 1 September 2015 with a board of 10 members. It was formed from a merger between Waterfront Auckland and Auckland Council Properties Limited (ACPL). The merged entity was briefly referred to as Development Auckland prior to its rebranding as Panuku.

In October 2016, Panuku began limiting the amount of information it released about discussions behind its closed door board meetings. At that time, it was managing $1 billion worth of council-owned land and buildings.

Panuku worked with the council's transport CCO Auckland Transport to re-house owners and tenants prior to the demolition of more than 60 properties in preparation for the construction of the Eastern Busway.

Nearby, 700 homes are being built by the partnership.

On 1 November 2019, it was announced that CEO Roger MacDonald had resigned after a period of leave. The reason for the leave has not been made public. Mayor of Auckland Phil Goff, who was re-elected in October 2019, had expressed dissatisfaction with MacDonald over an $80,000 increase in his salary, an executive bonus scheme introduced by him, and his acceptance of hospitality from a company which bought the council's former headquarters building through Panuku.

Chief executive officers
John Dalzell – interim CEO from 1 September 2015, formerly head of Waterfront Auckland
Roger MacDonald – November 2016 – 1 November 2019
David Rankin (acting) – November 2019 –

References

Auckland Council
Municipally owned companies